Denis Levaillant (born 3 August, 1952) is a French composer, pianist and writer based in Paris, France. He has orchestrated more than twenty musical shows including  and composed more than 120 musical works worldwide. Levaillant has been recognized for his improvisation and orchestration work and his ability to synthesize in his art several antagonistic genres such as composition/improvisation, classical/jazz, classical/popular and acoustic/electro.

Early life
Levaillant was born in Paris to Raymonde and Jean Levaillant. He is the grandson of the French poet and critic, . He started playing piano at an early age of five. He began harmony, counterpoint and composition training at the age of twelve, under French music professor, Magdeleine Mangin in 1964, in Nancy, France.

Levaillant first spent his teenage years in Nancy, then in Paris, where he studied composition and philosophy. In 1974, he received his Master's degree in philosophy from the University of Paris 1 Pantheon-Sorbonne. Later, he attended Conservatoire National Supérieur de Musique et de Danse de Paris, where he received training in music composition, orchestration and analysis under Gérard Grisey, Marius Constant and Claude Ballif.

Career
Levaillant started his professional career in the early 1970s. In 1973, he collaborated with Radio France and composed Circus Virus, a musical piece for France Culture. His first music had inspirations from his adolescence heroes, such as Karlheinz Stockhausen, Jimi Hendrix and Ornette Coleman. Through the 1970s and 1980s, Levaillant released seven more albums and published a book on music improvisation and compositions, L'improvisation musicale, published by Éditions Lattès in 1980.

In 1980, at the age of 26, Levaillant began composing ballet music for the Paris Opera. In 1981, he founded Bleu 17, a music institution that focused on producing musical shows.

From 1983 to 2006, Levaillant created nearly 20 musical shows and operas that were performed around Europe. He collaborated with Barry Altschul and Barre Phillips to compose Les Passagers du delta in 1986. Levaillant created the opera O.P.A Mia in collaboration with Enki Bilal during the Festival d'Avignon in 1990. He collaborated with Dominique Bagouet, Stéphanie Aubin, Brigitte Lefèvre, Dominique Petit and Caroline Marcadé for more than 30 live shows.

In the early 1980s, Levaillant participated in Institut national de l'audiovisuel and Groupe de Recherches Musicales's digital sound processing initiative, which inspired him to compose Piano Transit, a piano composition with electronic fusion, in 1983. In 1988, Levaillant was awarded with Prix Italia by RAI for his work, in the category Speakers.

In 1995, Levaillant was commissioned by Ensemble InterContemporain and Musée du Louvre for creating music for Fritz Lang's last silent film, Woman in the Moon. Over the years, prominent composers and musicians like Philippe Hersant, Allain Gaussin, Christian Zanési, Calin Ioachimescu and Doina Rotaru became part of the Cabinet de Musique Généraliste.

In the late 1990s, Levaillant performed live at various festivals and composed several works such as Echo de Narcisse, Le Clair, l'Obscur pour quatuor à cordes, Paysages de Conte and Tombeau de Gesualdo. In 2004, Lavaillant composed music for Enki Bilal's science fiction film, Immortal.

In 2002, Levaillant composed the ballet La Petite danseuse de Degas produced by the Paris Opera. It was premiered in 2003 at Opéra-Garnier and was performed again in 2005 and 2010. France 2 filmed the performance and Arthaus released the DVD. In 2005, l'Orchestre philharmonique de Radio France commissioned him to compose music for the children's book  by Jacques Prévert. In 2014, Levaillant wrote Panchamama Symphony, a composition for concert bands. The Andean music of Bolivia inspired Panchamama Symphony.

In 2014, 15 universities in the United States invited Levaillant for the master classes and concerts.

Personal life
Apart from being a musician, Levaillant is a mountaineer. He has climbed in Oisans alongside Jean-Michel Cambon and Bernard Francou. Levaillant has also climbed new challenging routes in Bolivia with the French climber, Alain Mesili.

Levaillant was married in 1972, to Christine Rigaud. The couple has two children, Julie and Fabien, and three grandchildren, Marilou, Elise and Andréa.

Awards and recognition
 1983 : Laureate of the Villa Médicis (New York)
 1987 : Prix Tendance
 1988 : Prix Italia, in the category Speakers

Discography

Albums and singles

 1973 : Son dernier Tango
 1975 : Attention l'armée,
 1978 : Instable,
 1979 : Trans-Musiques,
 1983 : Direct
 1984 : Six séquences pour Alfred Hitchcock
 1984 : Barium Circus
 1986 : Passages
 1990 : Musiques pour le théâtre
 1991 : Musiques pour le piano
 1991 : Musiques pour la danse
 1992 : Musiques pour les voix
 1993 : NEXT
 1995 : Génériques potentiels
 1996 : Théâtres
 1997 : Shorts !
 1998 : L'Etrange
 1999 : Out The/Ailleurs
 2000 : Direct
 2001 : Figures
 2002 : Dark Textures & Drones
 2003 : Documentary line
 2006 : Paysages avec piano
 2007 : Drone Music
 2008 : Modern Acoustic Sketches
 2009 : Music Is The Film
 2012 : The Fear Factory
 2014 : Cinematic Edge Vol.1
 2015 : City organix
 2018 : HAYDN Early and late Sonatas
 2019 : Aurora Borealis
 2019 : Cinematic Orchestral Music: Volume 1
 2019 : Cinematic Orchestral Music: Volume 2
 2020 : Electro Space Piano,

Reference: Denis Levaillant – Discographie : CDs / LPs, denislevaillant.net

Compositions for films

 1978 : La petite Annonce
 1979 : 74 rue de Boissy
 1981 : Adieu Pyrénées
 1984 : Elektra
 1985 : Trombone en coulisses
 1986 : Mot à mot
 1987 : L'eau en formes
 1988 : Mother Goose
 1989 : Vidéopérette,
 1993 : Next
 1995 : La Femme sur la Lune
 2003 : Dark
 2006 : Paysages avec piano
 2006 : Drones
 2008 : Blindspot
 2012 : The Fear Factory
 2015 : City Organix

Reference: Denis Levaillant – Music for films, denislevaillant.net

Bibliography

 1974 : Musique, Idéologie, Politique, mémoire de maîtrise de Philosophie
 1978 : Interdit d'antenne
 1980 : L'improvisation musicale
 1983/1984 : Eloge de l'outil
 1986 : Le Piano
 1990 : Un bout de tuyau avec quelques trous
 1990 : Auteur de musique
 1991 : Enki Bilal, un décorateur ?
 1991 : Trois motifs pour le jazz
 1992 : Pour une musique nouvelle
 1994 : La Femme sur la Lune, réflexion sur la relation musique et image
 2006 : O.P.A. MIA, Livre-DVD Illustré, broché,
 2006 : En lisant, en jouant, en écrivant (1)
 2008 : L'Opéra de la Lune
 2008 : Cent ans de bonheur
 2008 : A quoi l'art pense-t-il ?
 2008 : En lisant, en jouant, en écrivant
 2010 : La Petite danseuse de Degas (on Degas' Little Dancer of Fourteen Years)
 2011 : Les Musiciens de Brême
 2012 : Eloge du musical
 2012 : Paysages de conte
 2013 : Les Passagers du delta
 2014 : Manhattan Rhapsody
 2015 : L'Art de l'improvisation au piano
 2017 : O.P.A. MIA (My Tender Bid)

Reference: Denis Levaillant – Bibliography – Book CDs, denislevaillant.net

Operas and shows

 1974 : L'oreille bée
 1976 : Le Baigneur
 1978 : Embellie fixe
 1979 : Le jardin du sanglier
 1980 : Piano Check-up, La Chevauchée
 1981 : Portrait de l'artiste
 1981 : Grand Corridor
 1982 : Dérive
 1982 : D.D.Blue Gold Digger,
 1983 : Inside
 1983 : Aranzaquil
 1983 : Deux pièces à louer, Piano check-up & Le Baigneur
 1983 : Les Pas Perdus
 1984 : The Blue Street
 1984 : Rythm'n'shoes
 1986': Eaux-fortes
 1986 : Le Dernier Pèlerinage
 1986 : Les Passagers du delta
 1987 : Les heures défaites
 1987 : Solo piano solo
 1989 : O.P.A MIA
 1989 : Passage de l'heure bleue
 1992 : Lettres de Georgie, Ballet
 1993 : Piano Circus
 1994 : Poètes et burlesques, Spectacle musical, pièces pour piano accompagnant un programme de films Pathé des années 1910.
 1995 : Passions, Les Pierres noires, Sunny Cash passion, Compassion, Madrigaux de guerre & Tombeau de Gesualdo.
 1995 : La Femme sur la Lune
 1998/1999 : Techno Space Piano
 1999/2000 : Eloge de la radio
 2003 : La Petite danseuse
 2005/2006 : Un petit rien-du-tout
 2009/2010 : Les Musiciens de Brême

 Reference: Denis Levaillant – Operas and shows, denislevaillant.net

References

External links
 
 
 

French composers
20th-century French male pianists
French writers
French music arrangers
Musicians from Paris
1952 births
Living people